The thirty-fifth Oregon Legislative Assembly convened in 1929 for its biennial regular session, starting January 14 and finishing March 4. Republicans controlled both chambers with overwhelming majorities. Only four Democrats, two in the House and two in the Senate, were members of the thirty-fifth Legislative Assembly. The body held no special sessions; no such sessions were held at all between 1921 and 1933.

House members 
All representatives in the thirty-fifth House were Republicans except two, Walter S. Fisher (D–4 Roseburg) and Joseph N. Scott (D–22 Pendleton).

Speaker of the House: R. S. Hamilton (R–21 Bend).

Messenger to the Senate: Catherine Addink
Reading Clerk: Elbert Bede
Chief Clerk: W. F. Drager
Asst. Chief Clerk: Harry McCallen
Mailing Clerk: William F. McAdams
Doorkeeper: Rolls Southwick
Asst. Doorkeepers: B. E. Robertson, Glen A. Tousley
Calendar Clerk: Ruby Russell
Sergeant-at-Arms: Joseph F. Singer
Asst. Sergeant-at-Arms: J. A. Waddell
Messenger to the Printer: John F. Steelhammer
Pages: Denton Burdick, Jr., Harold Charters, Margarte Davidson

Senate members 
All members of the thirty-fifth Senate were Republicans except two, Edward F. Bailey (D–3 Junction City) and W. H. Strayer (D–23 Baker).

Senate President: A. W. Norblad (R–15 Astoria) (appointed Governor of Oregon upon death of incumbent Isaac Patterson on December 22, 1929.)

Doorkeeper: Joseph W. Beveridge
Sergeant-at-Arms: H. T. Bruce
Assistant Sergeant-at-Arms: F. A. Sutton
Chief Clerk: John P. Hunt
Assistant Chief Clerk: Elizabeth J. Glatt
Calendar Clerk: Albert D. Goddard
Reading Clerk: M. F. Hardesty
Pages: Clifford Flake, Max King, Edward Seeborg

See also 
 Oregon Legislative Assembly
 Oregon State Senate
 Oregon House of Representatives
 Government of Oregon

References 

 Oregon State Government Legislators and Staff, 1929 regular session, from Oregon State Archives

35
1929 in Oregon
1929 U.S. legislative sessions
1930 in Oregon
1930 U.S. legislative sessions